Michael Hodge (born 27 May 1989) is a former rugby union player. His regular playing position was either wing or centre. He has represented Australia national rugby sevens team and was named in the Waratahs squad ahead of the 2013 Super Rugby season. Having accepted a position as Head Coach for the Dallas Texas USA based Major League Rugby (MLR) franchise the Dallas Jackals in the Spring of 2021, Michael chose to remain in Australia in December 2021 instead. Declining to move to Texas 8 weeks before the MLR season was due to start. (Dallas Jackals’ first season).

Amateur career
Michael grew up in Canberra and  joined the Sydney University Football Club as an 18-year-old in 2008. That year, the 1st Colts won an undefeated premiership and Michael was awarded 1st Colts, Best and Fairest. He went on to play 70 1st Grade games, and in 2012 won his first Shute Shield Premiership and was awarded 1st Grade Players Player.

Professional career
After professional rugby stints with the Australian Sevens team and the NSW Waratahs, Michael retired from playing and took up a role as Senior Mathematics teacher and 1st XV Coach at Cranbrook School.

Coaching career
Michael then returned to the Sydney University Football Club in November 2018, as Director of Rugby. 

During his time he held additional coaching positions as U20s Head Coach, 1st Team Head Coach and Head of High Performance. 

In Spring 2021 he was appointed Head Coach of Major League Rugby expansion team, the Dallas Jackals. Hodge began the role remotely from Australia, but was ultimately unable to enter the U.S. in time for the beginning of the season due to COVID-19-related visa processing delays.  

Without a qualified professional coach, the franchise did not win a game their first season in the league.

Reference List

External links 

 Waratahs player profile

1989 births
Australian rugby union players
New South Wales Waratahs players
Rugby union wings
Rugby union centres
Living people
Sydney Stars players
Rugby union players from Canberra